Palawa kani is a constructed language created by the Tasmanian Aboriginal Centre as a composite Tasmanian language, based on reconstructed vocabulary from the limited accounts of the various languages once spoken by the eastern Aboriginal Tasmanians.

The centre wishes to keep the language private until it is established in the community and claims copyright. The United Nations Declaration on the Rights of Indigenous Peoples (UNDRIP) outlines that indigenous people should have the right to control their own cultural knowledge, including languages. However, languages cannot get copyright under Australian or international law. In practice, the centre only allows unrestricted outside access to place names; dictionaries and other copyrightable resources for learning the language are only provided to the Aboriginal community.

Background 

The Tasmanian languages were decimated after the British colonisation of Tasmania and the Black War. The last native speaker of any of the languages, Fanny Cochrane Smith, died in 1905.

In 1972, Robert M. W. Dixon and Terry Crowley investigated reconstructing the Tasmanian languages from existing records, in a project funded by the Australian Institute of Aboriginal Studies. This included interviewing two granddaughters of Fanny Cochrane Smith, who provided "five words, one sentence, and a short song". They were able to find "virtually no data on the grammar and no running texts" and stated "it is impossible to say very much of linguistic interest about the Tasmanian languages", and they did not proceed with the project.

In the late twentieth century, as part of community efforts to retrieve as much of the original Tasmanian culture as possible, the Tasmanian Aboriginal Centre attempted to reconstruct a language for the indigenous community. Due to the scarcity of records, palawa kani was constructed as a composite of several of the estimated dozen original Tasmanian languages.

Sources 
The two primary sources of lexical and linguistic material are Brian Plomley's 1976 word lists and Crowley and Dixon's 1981 chapter on Tasmanian. These are supplemented by archival research. The source languages are those of the Northeastern Tasmanian and Eastern Tasmanian language families, as these are ancestral to the modern palawa population as well as being the best attested Tasmanian languages. However, most place names are reconstructed using languages spoken around the locality as sources.

The words need to be reconstructed from the English pronunciation spellings that they were recorded in. 

State of the language 
Palawa kani was developed in the 1990s by the language program of the Tasmanian Aboriginal Centre, including Theresa Sainty, Jenny Longey and June Sculthorpe. 
The centre wishes to maintain community ownership of the language until the community is familiar and competent with it.

The language project is entirely community-based and the language is not taught in state schools but at various after-school events, organised camps and trips. There is obvious enthusiasm for the language, especially among younger people, and an increasing number of people are able to use the language to some extent, some to great fluency, though the centre requests that non-Aboriginals wanting to use the language first make a formal application to the centre. The centre rejects the classification of a "constructed language" for palawa kani. It has, in 2012, unsuccessfully filed a request to remove the Wikipedia articles on this language.

The animated television series Little J & Big Cuz was the first television show to feature an episode entirely in palawa kani, which was broadcast on the NITV network in 2017. In 2018, The Nightingale became the first major film to feature palawa kani, with consultation from aboriginal Tasmanian leaders. palawa kani is also used on a number of signs in Protected areas of Tasmania, for example kunanyi has been accepted as an official name for Mount Wellington, and what was formerly known as Asbestos Range National Park is now known as Narawntapu National Park.

Official place names 

Palawa kani has been formally legitimated through the Tasmanian governmental Aboriginal and Dual Naming Policy of 2013, which "allows for an Aboriginal and an introduced name to be used together as the official name and for new landmarks to be named according to their Aboriginal heritage". These include kanamaluka / Tamar River and kunanyi / Mount Wellington.

A number of other palawa kani place names exist, but are not in official use. Some are modern descriptive names rather than historically attested.

Phonology 
In the following table, the IPA is first listed. The orthography is listed in italics if it differs from the IPA.

The vowels are a, i, u and the diphthongs /ei/ (ay) and /oi/ (uy).

Consonant clusters include pr, tr and kr.

Like most mainland languages, Tasmanian languages lacked sibilants (which is apparent in the aboriginal pronunciation of English words like sugar, where the 's' was replaced with a t in pidgin English), and this is reflected in palawa kani.

The pronunciation of palawa kani may reflect those words preserved in the now English-speaking palawa community, but does not reflect how the original Tasmanian words were likely to have been pronounced. Taylor (2006) states that "the persons who contributed to the project would appear to have uncritically accepted phonological features of the Australian Mainland languages as a guide to palawa phonology without undertaking an adequate comparative analysis of the orthographies used by the European recorders", and gives three examples:
In transcriptions with consonant + 'y', the 'y' is taken to be the vowel i or ay despite Milligan's statement that it was a 'y'-like sound (~). In word-final position, 'y' did not indicate a vowel, as palawa kani assumes, but rather forms a digraph for one of the consonants ty, ny, ly, etc. 
The sequence 'tr' is treated as a consonant cluster, when it was presumably a postalveolar affricate closer to English j or ch.
'r' transcribed before a consonant or at the end of a word is taken to indicate a long vowel or the kind of vowel quality found in modern Australian English words with such spellings, but the English-speaking transcribers of Tasmanian spoke rhotic dialects of English, while others spoke Danish or French, and apparently the r's were to be pronounced. 'r' transcribed before a consonant is likely to have been part of a digraph for a retroflex consonant, such as "rl" or "rn".

Orthography
The Tasmanian Aboriginal Centre has decided that palawa kani should only be written in lowercase letters. Initial capital letters may be used for names of people and "family/Ancestral collectives".

Grammar 
Nouns do not have number, and verbs do not indicate person or tense, e.g. waranta takara milaythina nara takara 'we walk where (place) they walked'.

In the early stages of the palawa kani project, it was assumed that virtually no grammatical information had been preserved from the original Tasmanian languages, and that palawa kani would have to draw heavily on grammatical features of English. Since then, more thorough analysis by the Tasmanian Aboriginal Centre of words and sentences collected in wordlists of the Tasmanian languages have provided evidence of word orders differing from English, loanwords, adaptation of words to talk about introduced concepts, and suffixes. These grammatical and vocabulary features have been incorporated into palawa kani.

The only running text recorded for the original Tasmanian languages is a sermon preached by George Robinson on Bruny Island in 1829, after being on the island for only eight weeks. His "Tasmanian" was actually English replaced word-for-word with Tasmanian words that had been stripped of their grammar, much as occurs in a contact pidgin. Robinson is one of the principal primary sources for palawa kani.

Pronouns 
There are two sets of pronouns,

The second- and third-person plural pronouns are formed by adding mapali ("many") to the respective singular pronouns; no second- or third-person plural pronouns are attested in the known documentation of the original Tasmanian languages.

mapali 'many' may be used to distinguish mana 'my' from mana-mapali 'our, your'.

nika also means 'this', as in milaythina nika 'their lands / this land'.

Numbers 
The numerals are,

These are conjoined for pamakati 11, payakati 12, etc.

For the decades, -ka is added to the digit, for payaka 20, luwaka 30, etc. For the hundreds and thousands, -ki and -ku are added, for pamaki 100, maraki 500, pamaku 1000, taliku 9000, etc.

Sample text

This sample is a eulogy by the Tasmanian Aboriginal Centre Language Program first used at the 2004 anniversary of the Risdon Cove massacre of 1804.

Other versions are available, including one with a sound recording.

See also 
 Australian Aboriginal languages

References

Bibliography 
 T. Crowley & R.M.W. Dixon (1981) 'Tasmanian'. In Dixon & Blake (eds.), Handbook of Australian Languages, pp. 395–427. The Australian National University Press.
 Plomley, N. J. B. (1976), A word-list of the Tasmanian languages, N. J. B. Plomley and the Government of Tasmania
 "Pakana Luwana Liyini" 2005 (CD), Tasmanian Aboriginal Centre Inc
 Sainty, T., "Tasmanian places and Tasmanian Aboriginal language" 2005, Placenames Australia Newsletter of the Australian National Placenames Survey

External links 
palawa-kani program at the Tasmanian Aboriginal Centre
Dewayne Everettsmith singing a Palawa-kani song
Breathing new life into Indigenous language, 936 ABC Hobart, 15 June 2012

Indigenous Australian languages in Tasmania
Zonal constructed languages
Constructed languages introduced in the 1990s
Language revival
Indigenous Australians in Tasmania